Anastasia Alekseevna Bitsenko, née Kameristaya (née Камeристая; 10 November 1875 – 16 June 1938) was a Narodnik-inspired, later Communist, Russian revolutionary. As a member of a socialist revolutionary  (SR) flying combat detachment, she came to fame for assassinating the former Russian Minister of War Viktor Sakharov in 1905. After being held in detention for over 11 years, she was freed during the February Revolution and joined the Left Socialist-Revolutionaries. For her achievements, the party designated her as their representative within the Soviet delegation for the German-Russian peace negotiations in World War I, which resulted in the Treaty of Brest-Litovsk. She eventually sided with the Soviet regime for good, adhering to the Communist ideology.

Early life and arrest
Anastasia (Nastya) Kameristaya was born on 10 November 1875 in the small village of Aleksandrovka (now part of Donetsk) in the Bakhmutsky Uyezd of the Yekaterinoslav Governorate, Russian Empire. Born into a peasant family, she benefited "from the educational reforms of Tsar Alexander II [and] acquired enough schooling to qualify as a teacher" in primary schools. During a famine that spread across Russia in 1899, she organised a communal kitchen for the starving, hungry in Kazan. Later she attended further courses in Moscow in order to qualify to teach at the secondary level, as well. 

Her pedagogical training, however, was disrupted by her engagement in the revolutionary cause, probably fostered by her meeting Mikhail Stepanovich Bitsenko, a fellow student at the Moscow Agricultural Institute (albeit 7 years her senior) and a socialist revolutionary  (SR) agitator, who became her husband. In 1901 they were picked up by the police for participating in students disorders and banished from Moscow to the remote Irkutsk province. Returned to European Russia in 1903, they "assisted in the founding of an SR organisation in Smolensk", but they probably broke up later that year, when Anastasiya left Smolensk for St. Petersburg, while "Mikhail continued to work with the Smolensk SRs." They were never to reunite, but, although she appears to have never told of or just mentioned again her former husband, she maintained his surname throughout her life. 

In St. Pertersburg Nastya became a full-time activist of the SR party and was involved in a female terrorist group aiming at assassinating the Minister of the Interior, Vyacheslav von Plehve. Betrayed by an informer, she was arrested in late January 1904 and kept in preliminary detention until mid-March to 1905 when she was exiled to Vologda near the Arctic Circle. After just one month of settlement she escaped abroad, to Geneva, but in August returned, illegally,  to  Moscow, as a member of the Moscow committee of the SR party, responsible for organising railroad workers. In following November she joined an SR flying combat detachment. (The central SR Combat Organization had been temporarily disbanded and the PSR's central committee had decided to discontinue terror after the issue of the October Manifesto. Many members and groups, however, would not abide by the party's decision). Bitsenko volunteered to lead a terrorist plot against the "butcher of Saratov", as revolutionaries would call  ex-Minister of War, Viktor Sakharov, who had been dispatched to the Saratov province in order to repress grave peasant unrest. On 22 November Bitsenko managed to slip into governor Piotr Stolypin's palace in Saratov and to get herself admitted to the presence of General Sakharov: there she laid upon Sakharov's desk the death sentence passed on him by the local SR committee and immediately shot him dead. She was captured, brought to trial, and initially condemned to be hanged; but her punishment was soon commuted to penal labour for life to be served at the Nerchinsk katorga in Transbaikal (east of Lake Baikal, near the border of China). 

She was sent to Siberia in the company of five other prominent female SR terrorists, including Maria Spiridonova. The group was sometimes called the Shesterka ("Six") and gained enormous popularity. Their slow journey by train lasted around a month and turned into a kind of "triumphal progress": the train was met at every stop by growing crowds of sympathizers and the revolutionaries (with Spiridonova ahead) would greet and talk with them as long as possible, expounding the SR political program. Bitsenko spent the following eleven years in the penal colonies of Akatuy and Maltsev in the Nerchinsk katorga.

Soviet Russia 

As a result of the February Revolution in 1917 she was freed and returned to political action within the Socialist Revolutionary Party firstly in Chita, and then Moscow, where she was elected again to the regional party committee. She participated during the October political uprising as a member of the Petrograd Military Revolutionary Committee and then joined the Left Socialist-Revolutionaries rising through the ranks of the new party. She was a member of the Central Committee of the Left SRs, of the praesidium of the Moscow Soviet, and the Central Executive Committee of the soviets.  As reward for her efforts in the party, she was designated to be one of the seven members of the Soviet Delegation for the German-Soviet peace talks for World War I in Brest-Litovsk. Bitsenko was the only woman present during the negotiations; her appointment was a political manoeuvre by the Bolsheviks to give representation to the rival Left Socialist-Revolutionaries. The talks concluded with the signing of the Treaty of Brest-Litovsk, a hugely popular peace treaty which ended the fighting on the Eastern Front.

Bitsenko returned to Russia and continued her party activities. Being strongly opposed to the rupture with the Bolsheviks, in September 1918 she was a founder of the splinter Party of Revolutionary Communism.  In November she joined the newly renamed Russian Communist Party (Bolsheviks), later holding various political and committee positions in the Soviet Union. After the death of Lenin, widespread purges were extended to the ranks of the Communist Party by the new Soviet supreme leader Joseph Stalin, and she became one of the many targets. Accused of being a member of a terrorist organization she was put on trial and sentenced to death. On 16 June 1938 she was shot and buried at the Kommunarka shooting ground. The Soviet authorities acquitted her posthumously in 1961.

References

Bibliography

Further reading

External links
Der Waffenstillstand von Brest-Litowsk (The Brest-Litovsk Peace Treaty) - Archived original newsreel from 1917 documenting the delegates (including Bitsenko)

1875 births
1938 deaths
Politicians from Donetsk
People from Bakhmutsky Uyezd
Left socialist-revolutionaries
Bolsheviks
Treaty of Brest-Litovsk negotiators
Executed Soviet women
Communists from the Russian Empire
Marxists from the Russian Empire
Revolutionaries from the Russian Empire
Soviet women in politics
Soviet women diplomats
Female murderers from the Russian Empire
Assassins from the Russian Empire
Great Purge victims from Russia
Female revolutionaries
Executed revolutionaries
Members of the Communist Party of the Soviet Union executed by the Soviet Union